The QJ was a type of heavy freight steam locomotive introduced in 1956 by the China Railway. The majority were built by Datong Locomotive Factory. The prototypes and early production of the class were designated HP, being redesignated as FD class during the Cultural Revolution, before becoming the QJ class in 1971.

The class became the primary mainline freight locomotive on the Chinese rail network by the 1980s. Manufactured until 1988, they were displaced by diesel locomotives in 2005. A total of 4,717 were produced. After the end of steam on the national Chinese railway network many QJ locomotives were used on industrial lines, as well as on the Jitong railway. Several members of the class have been preserved.

History and design 

42 prototypes were built by Dalian locomotive works, Tangshan locomotive works, and Shenyang, Mudanjiang, Changchun and Datong locomotive factories between 1956 and 1960. Originally the locomotives were designated as the HP (Heping meaning 'peace') class. The design is thought to be based in part on the Russian LV class. (see Паровоз ЛВ Russian).

The main tranche of production took place at Datong, beginning in 1964 starting with locomotive HP 101. A number of modifications were made to the locomotive, including a new design of boiler for the production version. The 500th QJ was built in 1968, the 1,000th in 1970, the 2,000th in 1974 and the 3,000th in 1979, with production rates varying from 150 to over 300 per year between 1966 and 1985. Production ended in 1988 with 4,717 produced.

In 1966 during the Cultural Revolution the locomotives were given the class FD (反帝 Fandi meaning 'anti-imperialism'), after 1971 the class was renamed again becoming the QJ class (Qian Jin, meaning 'march forward' or 'progress').

The prototypes used 8 wheel tenders, while later production models used 12 wheel tenders.
QJs were equipped with mechanical stokers, feedwater heaters, electric lights, and air horns. Various modifications were used on some engines, including an ejector similar to the giesl type and smoke deflectors. One unit was used as a test bed for a 'Gas Producer Combustion System' (GPCS) in the 1980s.

A small number of locomotives were built to broad (Russian) 1,520 mm gauge.

Work history
The class became the primary freight locomotive on both the primary and secondary lines of the Chinese railway network by the 1980s, having displaced both JF and FD classes. From the late 1980s and through the 1990s the class were replaced by diesel locomotives. Steam traction officially ended on the Chinese national rail network in 2002, but a few units remained in use up to 2003 on minor lines.

The locomotives were also used on large passenger trains, when their high tractive power was advantageous.

After withdrawal from the Chinese national network many units were acquired by industrial railways as well as the regional Jitong Railway in Inner Mongolia which operated ~100 units. By 2005 the Jitong Railway had also replaced the QJ locomotives with diesel engines. Some remained in use on industrial lines in China in 2010.

Preservation

QJ Class in the United States
Two engines withdrawn from use in China, numbers 6988 and 7081 (both former Jitong Railway), were originally acquired by the Iowa Interstate Railroad and later donated to Central States Steam Preservation Association. A third, number 7040 (re-numbered to 2008), was acquired by the Lexington, Kentucky-based RJ Corman in 2008, and operated until 2013, when it was placed on display in a specially built glass display building in Lexington. In 2020, Corman donated the engine to the Kentucky Steam Heritage Corporation.

Iowa Interstate 7081 retains its original Chinese appearance with the exception of the Jitong lettering and logo being replaced with the Iowa Interstate's, and the mandatory changes required by U.S. law such as hand rails and a bell. IAIS 6988 was "Americanized" in time for operation at Train Festival 2011 in Rock Island, Illinois. The diesel-style bell originally installed when it arrived in Iowa was replaced with a steam engine type bell, the Chinese headlights were replaced with an American style light with a cast number plate under it, and an American steam whistle was installed. The steel sheet on the front was removed and all red paint was painted over in black, with white trim on the running boards, wheel rims, etc. The RJ Corman locomotive has been heavily modified. Most notably the smoke deflectors have been removed along with new paint and skirts along the running boards.

Museums
Several of the class are on static display around China:

QJ-0001 and QJ-0004, QJ-101 are displayed at the China Railway Museum

QJ-1316 is on display at China Industrial Museum

QJ-1450 is on display at Tangshan Locomotive Depot, Beijing Railway Bureau

QJ-2655 is on display at Technik Museum Speyer in Germany

QJ-6020 is on display at Jining Locomotive Depot, Hohhot Railway Bureau

QJ-6368 and QJ-6540 are displayed at Shenyang Railway Museum

QJ-6911 is on display at Daban Locomotive Depot, Jitong Railway

Notes

References

External links 

2-10-2 locomotives
Steam locomotives of China
Steam locomotives of the United States
Railway locomotives introduced in 1956
CNR Datong Electric Locomotive Co. locomotives
Freight locomotives
5 ft gauge locomotives
Standard gauge locomotives of China
Standard gauge locomotives of the United States